was a prominent Japanese physiologist who uncovered the regulatory role of calcium in cells. He is famous for the discovery of Troponin in 1965, which is integral to muscle contraction, as well as for the contribution of diagnosis of muscular dystrophy.

Life
Ebashi was born in Tokyo, and received his medical degree in 1944 and Ph.D. in 1954 from the University of Tokyo. He was Guest Investigator of the Rockefeller Institute in New York City from January to December 1959, where he studied with Fritz Lipmann.

Ebashi was Professor and Chair of Pharmacology at the Faculty of Medicine, University of Tokyo from May 1959 until March 1983, as well as Professor and Chair of Biophysics at the School of Science from May 1971 to March 1983. He trained many graduate students and postdoctorals who later became leading figures in basic medical sciences in Japan, including Tomoh Masaki who discovered Endothelin in 1988.

After retiring from the University of Tokyo and becoming Professor Emeritus, Ebashi was offered a professorship in the National Institute for Physiological Sciences in Okazaki. He became Director-General of National Institute for Physiological Sciences in April 1985, and President of Okazaki National Institutes including National Institute for Physiological Sciences in March 1991.

Recognition
Ebashi was awarded several honors including, the 1968 Asahi Prize, the 1972 Imperial Prize of the Japan Academy, the 1999 International Prize for Biology, the Order of the Sacred Treasure, and an Order of Culture. He was elected as a foreign member of the Royal Society (ForMemRS) in 1977 and a member of the Japan Academy (MJA) in 1978.

Setsuro Ebashi Award
Since 2007 the Japanese Pharmacological Society has awarded the Setsuro Ebashi Award to researchers who made a considerable achievement in the field of pharmacology in honor of Setsuro Ebashi who contributed on a global scale to the field of biomedical research. Shinya Yamanaka, the 2008 Setsuro Ebashi Award winner, received the Nobel Prize in Physiology or Medicine in 2012.

Publications
 Hiroshi Yoshida, Yashiro Hagihara, Setsuro Ebashi (ed) Advances in pharmacology and therapeutics II Pergamon, 1982, 
Novel developments on genetic recombination: dna double-strand break and dna end-joining, Japan Scientific Soc. Press, 2004
Setsuro Ebashi, E. Ozawa (ed) Muscular Dystrophy: Biomedical Aspects, Springer Verlag, 1983, 
Protein array: an alternative biomolecular system Japan Scientific Soc. Press, 1997
Muscle elastic proteins,  Japan Scientific Soc. Press, 1996

References

External links
Biophysics in Japan, its Past, Present and Future

Japanese physiologists
Japanese biophysicists
Japanese biochemists
1922 births
2006 deaths
People from Tokyo
University of Tokyo alumni
Academic staff of the University of Tokyo
Laureates of the Imperial Prize
Recipients of the Order of Culture
Recipients of the Order of the Sacred Treasure, 1st class
Foreign Members of the Royal Society
Foreign associates of the National Academy of Sciences
Japanese expatriates in the United States